Cheras LRT station is a Malaysian light rail transit station situated near and named after the Kuala Lumpur township of Cheras. The station is part of the Sri Petaling Line (formerly known as STAR).

The station was opened on July 11, 1998, as part of the second phase of the STAR system's opening, including 7 new stations along the Chan Sow Lin-Sri Petaling route.At that time, Cheras station was named as "Seri Mas" station.

Location 
Despite its name, Cheras station is not located within or close to the Kuala Lumpur township of Cheras. Rather, the station is situated between the northern Sungai Besi region, Taman Ikan Emas and Salak South, a kilometre northwest from the nearest border to Cheras. The station is thus more reachable to users from the aforementioned three areas, as well as Bandar Sri Permaisuri (Sri Permaisuri Town) to the south, than Cheras.

The station's main access point faces the southeast towards Taman Ikan Emas and is accessible via Jalan Jelawat Satu (Jelawat Road One). In the beginning of its operation, the Cheras station was primarily accessible via a footbridge crossing a ditch. Beginning June 2007, construction work was conducted directly in front of the station, demolishing the original path and requiring a temporary route around the construction site for access into the station.

Until late 2006, the western side of the station was lined along a backroad that branched off Jalan 3/12, and several industrial buildings. The area had since been partially cleared away for the construction of the Kuala Lumpur–Putrajaya Expressway, slated for opening in 2008. While the station itself is unaffected, access from the west now requires crossing an overhead bridge prepared along with the expressway.

The Cheras station was constructed along two leveled tracks, reusing the now defunct Federated Malay States Railway and Malayan Railway route between Kuala Lumpur, Ampang and Salak South. The station is also the last station from the Putra Heights terminal station before a convergence with the Ampang-bound line at the Chan Sow Lin interchange, 1.5 km northward.

Design 

The Cheras station is a low-rise structure with two side platforms lined along two tracks for trains traveling in opposite direction. However, unlike the many subsurface stations dotted along the Miharja-Ampang route, the Cheras station was sited on a set of tracks significantly lower than subsurface stations (similar to the Cahaya station), and only includes a single ticket area, as opposed to two for each platform, because a deep tunnel was built linking both platforms. The station also serves as a public crossing by pedestrians and motorcyclists across the Sri Petaling Line tracks between the southeast and northwest via another underground path running beneath the tracks and platforms.

The principal styling of the station is similar to most other stations in the line, featuring curved roofs supported by latticed frames, and white plastered walls and pillars. Because the tunnel linking both platforms are connected only by stairways, the station is not accommodative to disabled users.

See also 
 List of rail transit stations in Klang Valley

References 

Ampang Line
Railway stations opened in 1998